"Before the Great Collapse" is a single by hip hop duo Jedi Mind Tricks, released in 2004 through Babygrande Records. The single was the lead-off for the group's fourth album, Legacy of Blood. The song's intro contains a sample from "Freeman's Farm" by David Elon Preston, and the song's music contains a sample from "No Me Des Tu Adios" by Perla. "Before the Great Collapse" was the first JMT single to be solely performed by group vocalist Vinnie Paz, who uses the track as a suicide letter, written to his mother. The track is followed up on JMT's Servants in Heaven, Kings in Hell with the track Razorblade Salvation, in which Vinnie Paz retracts his suicide note, citing his obligations and goals as reasons to "stick around for a while."

While "Before the Great Collapse" was the single's official A-Side, the B-Side track "On the Eve of War" was Legacy of Blood's lead single. Like their previous album's lead single, "Animal Rap", the single contains two mixes of the song, subtitled "On the Eve of War (Julio César Chávez Mix)" and "On the Eve of War (Meldrick Taylor Mix)", referencing the rivalry between the two boxers. The former features a symphonic sample, taken from the track "Palladio I - Allegretto" by Karl Jenkins. The latter features a melancholy guitar sample taken from the track "Peace" by Paul Kelly. Both versions of "On the Eve of War" feature a guest appearance from Wu-Tang Clan member GZA. The single was followed in 2005 by "The Age of Sacred Terror".

Track listing

A-Side
"Before the Great Collapse" (Clean Version)
"On the Eve of War (Julio César Chávez Mix)" (Clean Version) (feat. GZA)
"Before the Great Collapse" (Instrumental)

B-Side
"On the Eve of War (Meldrick Taylor Mix)" (Clean Version) (feat. GZA)
"On the Eve of War (Julio César Chávez Mix)" (Dirty Version) (feat. GZA)
"On the Eve of War (Julio César Chávez Mix)" (Instrumental)

Song order

"Before the Great Collapse"
Performed by: Vinnie Paz

"On the Eve of War"
First verse: Vinnie Paz
Second verse: GZA

Notes
"Before the Great Collapse" contains samples from the movie The Addiction.
"Before the Great Collapse" contains a sample from "No Me Des Tu Adios" by Perla.
"Before the Great Collapse" contains a sample from "Freeman's Farm" by David Elon Preston
The song "Razorblade Salvation", from the album "Servants in Heaven, Kings in Hell" is a sequel to "Before the Great Collapse". It tells a different story than the song.
"On the Eve of War" contains samples from "Third World" by DJ Muggs.
"On the Eve of War" samples the blow-by-blow and color commentary from the first bout between Vinny Paz (the boxer) and his rival Greg Haugen for the IBF lightweight title.
"On the Eve of War (Julio César Chávez Mix)" contains a sample from "Palladio I - Allegretto" by Karl Jenkins.
"On the Eve of War (Meldrick Taylor Mix)" contains a sample from "Peace" by Paul Kelly.

2004 singles
Jedi Mind Tricks songs
2004 songs